Barthelémy Adoukonu (born 18 September 1957) is a Beninese boxer. He competed in the 1980 Summer Olympics.

References

1957 births
Living people
Boxers at the 1980 Summer Olympics
Beninese male boxers
Olympic boxers of Benin
Featherweight boxers